is a Japanese politician of the Liberal Democratic Party and member of the House of Representatives in the Diet (national legislature), representing the Tottori 2nd district in Tottori Prefecture.

A native of Bunkyō, Tokyo and graduate of the University of Tokyo, he joined the Ministry of Transport in 1984 and attended Cornell University in the United States while in the ministry.

He was elected to the House of Representatives for the first time in the 2005 Japanese general election where he was one of the so-called "Koizumi Children" elected amid the popularity of Prime Minister Junichiro Koizumi. He was re-elected in the 2009 general election and the 2012 general election.

He gained some notoriety in August 2011 after berating Economy Minister Banri Kaieda for twenty minutes on the floor of the Diet over the ministry's handling of the Fukushima disaster, ultimately bringing Kaieda to tears. Kaieda resigned several days later.

His great-grandfather was a former samurai and industrialist, while his grandfather Masamichi Akazawa was a Japanese diplomat prior to World War II and served in the Diet after the war, including as a cabinet minister under Hayato Ikeda and Eisaku Satō.

Honours 
 : Grand Officer of the Order of Orange-Nassau (29 October 2014)

References

External links 
 Official website in Japanese.

Politicians from Tokyo
University of Tokyo alumni
Cornell University alumni
Koizumi Children
Members of the House of Representatives (Japan)
Living people
1960 births
Liberal Democratic Party (Japan) politicians